Pierre Paul-Hus  is a Canadian politician, who was elected to represent the riding of Charlesbourg—Haute-Saint-Charles in the House of Commons of Canada in the 2015 Canadian federal election.

Biography

Paul-Hus is a graduate of political science at Laval University and owner of PRESTIGE Media Group. He has also been vice president of Sélections Mondiales des Vins Canada (the largest wine competition in North America) for 11 years.

Military career

Paul-Hus is a military officer (Reserve) and a graduate of the Canadian Army Command and Staff College in Kingston, Ontario and the Ecole Militaire in Paris, where he also taught. In 1987, when Paul-Hus graduated from high school, he enlisted and joined the Régiment de la Chaudière, reserve unit of the Canadian Armed Forces. During the 22 years of his military service, he has conducted two operational missions: one in Goose Bay, Labrador, under the aegis of NATO, and the second in Cyprus to the United Nations. He retired in 2009 at the rank of lieutenant-colonel.

Political career

In 2011, Paul-Hus finished third for the Conservative Party in Louis-Hébert. He ran again in 2015, in the riding of Charlesbourg—Haute-Saint-Charles and was successful, defeating Incumbent Anne-Marie Day. He is currently serving as the Official Opposition Shadow Minister for Public safety and Emergency preparedness.

He is Vice-Chair of the Standing Committee on Public Safety and National Security. In addition, he is also Vice-Chairman of the Defense and Security Committee of the NATO Parliamentary Association.

Electoral record

References

External links

1969 births
Living people
Canadian Army officers
Canadian officials of the United Nations
Conservative Party of Canada MPs
French Quebecers
Politicians from Quebec City
Université Laval alumni
21st-century Canadian politicians
Régiment de la Chaudière